Fuyuan may refer to:

Fuyuan River (富源溪), tributary of the Xiuguluan River, Taiwan
Fuyuan, Heilongjiang (抚远), formerly Fuyuan County
Fuyuan Town (抚远镇), seat of Fuyuan, Heilongjiang
Fuyuan County, Yunnan (富源县)